The Zirid conquest of Morocco occurred in 979 when Buluggin Ibn Ziri led a campaign to expand his territory.

In 979 Buluggin Ibn Ziri led a campaign into Morocco. He seized Fez, Sijilmasa and briefly held most of Morocco by 980. 

Buluggin Ibn Ziri died of an illness in 984 in Sijilmasa and his successor decided to abandon Morocco in 985.

See also
Zirid expedition to Barghawata

References 

Military expeditions
Zirid dynasty
10th century in Morocco